Auricularia americana  is a species of fungus in the family Auriculariaceae. Basidiocarps (fruitbodies} are gelatinous, ear-like, and grow on dead conifer wood. The species was formerly confused with Auricularia auricula-judae, which grows on broadleaf wood and is confined to Europe.

Taxonomy 
The species was originally described in 1987 from Quebec on Abies balsamea, but was not validly published until 2003. Molecular research, based on cladistic analysis of DNA sequences, has shown that Auricularia americana is a distinct species.

Description 
The fruitbodies occur singly or in clusters. The upper surface is finely pilose. The spore-bearing underside is smooth.

Microscopic characters 
The microscopic characters are typical of the genus Auricularia. The basidia are tubular, laterally septate, 55–70 × 4–5 µm. The spores are allantoid (sausage-shaped), 14–16.5 × 4.5–5.5 µm.

Habitat and distribution 
Auricularia americana is a wood-rotting species, typically found on dead attached or fallen wood of conifers. It is widely distributed in North America and is also known from China and the Russian Far East.

Similar species 
In North America, Auricularia angiospermarum is almost identical but grows on the wood of broadleaf trees. No other North American Auricularia species grows on conifer wood. In China and Tibet, however, a second species, Auricularia tibetica, also occurs on conifers. It can be distinguished microscopically by its longer basidia and larger basidiospores.

References 

Auriculariales
Fungi of North America
Fungi of China